Julia E. Coleman (born December 19, 1991) is an American politician and member of the Minnesota Senate. A Republican, she has represented Carver County in the southwestern Twin Cities metropolitan area since 2021.

Early life, education, and career 
Coleman was born on December 19, 1991, and raised in Maplewood. She graduated from the University of Minnesota, Twin Cities.

Minnesota Senate 
Coleman was elected to the Minnesota Senate in 2020, replacing fellow Republican Scott Jensen, who did not seek reelection.

Personal life 
Coleman and her husband, Jacob, reside in Chanhassen. They have three children. Coleman is the daughter-in-law of Norm Coleman, a former United States Senator from Minnesota.

References

External links 

 Official Senate website
 Official campaign website

1991 births
Living people
University of Minnesota alumni
Republican Party Minnesota state senators
21st-century American politicians